The Kalmyk Loop  is a fixed loop still largely unused in the West, but common in Russia and often used instead of the bowline.

The knot is named after the Kalmyks, a nomad ethnicity in Russia. 

It is very quick to tie, it is secure, and it undoes quickly when pulling the free end.
The knot is not mentioned in The Ashley Book of Knots but is found in its Russian equivalent, the book "Морские узлы" by Lev Skryagin.

Without the slip, the knot is known as the Cossack knot or Eskimo bowline.

Sources 
Скрягин Л. Н. Морские узлы — Москва, Транспорт, 1982

External links 
 russian article with pictures
 Kalmyk Loop (калмыцкий узел)
 Can the Kalmyk Unseat the Bowline as King of Knots?
Video: How to tie 1
Video: How to tie 2
Video: How to tie 3
Knots